The Impact Knockouts World Tag Team Championship is a women's professional wrestling tag team championship owned by the professional wrestling promotion Impact Wrestling. It is contested for mainly by teams consisting of two female wrestlers in Impact Wrestling, known as the Impact Knockouts, in Impact's women's division; however, the championship was once held by a male. The current champions are The Coven (Taylor Wilde and KiLynn King).

The creation of the championship was announced on August 20, 2009 during a backstage segment on Total Nonstop Action Wrestling's (TNA), now Impact Wrestling's primary television program TNA Impact!. Like most professional wrestling championships, the title is won via the result of a scripted match. Sarita and Taylor Wilde were the inaugural champions. They won a four-week tournament to crown the first champions. The longest reigning champions were ODB and Eric Young, who held the titles for a record 478 days before the 2013 deactivation of the titles due to Eric Young being a male talent.

On October 24, 2020 at Bound For Glory the revival of the titles were officially announced by Madison Rayne, with a tournament to award the revived championships taking place. On January 16, 2021, the tournament finals were won by Fire N Flava (Kiera Hogan and Tasha Steelz) at Hard To Kill.

History

Impact Knockout (formerly TNA Knockout), or just Knockout for short, is the term used by Impact Wrestling (formerly TNA's Total Nonstop Action Wrestling) to refer to its onscreen female employees; this is similar to World Wrestling Entertainment and the Divas pseudonym they then used. In October 2007 at TNA's Bound for Glory PPV event, TNA established their first women's championship, with Gail Kim winning a 10 knockout gauntlet match to become the first TNA Women's Knockout Champion.

On the August 20, 2009 episode of Impact!, backstage interviewer Lauren, who was standing with and about to interview Christy Hemme, Tara, Taylor Wilde, and Sarita, announced that TNA were planning to host an eight-team single elimination tag team tournament to crown the first-ever TNA Knockouts Tag Team Champions. After a four-way match consisting of Hemme, Traci Brooks, Sarita, and Awesome Kong, TNA commentators Mike Tenay and Taz announced that the tournament would began on the August 27 episode of Impact!. The first champions were crowned at No Surrender, where Sarita and Taylor Wilde defeated The Beautiful People.

During the first years of the title, it was vacated twice due to one half of the champions being released. On March 8, 2010, Awesome Kong left TNA after an incident with Bubba the Love Sponge. On December of that year, Hamada was released. On February 28, 2011, ODB and Eric Young defeated Gail Kim and Madison Rayne to win the titles. Young also became the only male to win the championship. They only defended the titles two times, but held the belts for 478 days. On the June 20, 2013 episode of Impact Wrestling, Knockouts Division Executive Brooke Hogan stripped ODB and Young of the title because Young is a male. This ultimately resulted in the titles being deactivated.

On October 24, 2020 at the Bound for Glory pay-per-view, Madison Rayne announced that after nearly eight years of inactivity, Impact Wrestling would revive the Knockouts Tag Team Championship taking off the TNA prefix and changing it to the Impact prefix. It was also announced that an eight-team tournament would take place over the next two months to determine the next champions. The brackets were announced in November, with the final taking place at the Hard To Kill pay-per-view on January 16, 2021. At the event, Fire N Flava (Kiera Hogan and Tasha Steelz) defeated Havok and Nevaeh in the tournament final to win the revived titles.

Championship Tournaments

Inaugural championship tournament (2009)

Vacated championship tournament (2010)
On the December 9, 2010, edition of Impact! TNA vacated the TNA Knockouts Tag Team Championship, after one half of the previous champions, Hamada, had been released by the promotion, and set up a four–team tournament to determine new champions. The finals of the tournament would take place on the December 23 edition of Impact!.

Teams:
The Beautiful People (Angelina Love and Velvet Sky)
Daffney and Sarita
Madison Rayne and Tara
Mickie James and Miss Tessmacher

*Winter replaced Velvet Sky, who had been attacked backstage by Sarita.

Revival tournament (2020-2021)

Reigns 

The inaugural champions were Sarita and Wilde, who defeated The Beautiful People (Rayne and Sky) in the finals of an eight-team tournament to crown the first TNA Knockouts Tag Team Champions. At 478 days, Eric Young and ODB hold the record for the longest reign in the title's history. Jordynne Grace's and Rachael Ellering's reign holds the record for the shortest reign in the title's history at 20 days. Young is the first and only male wrestler to have held the title.

The Coven (Taylor Wilde and KiLynn King) are the current champions in their first reign as a team. Individually, Wilde is in her record tying third reign, while King is in her first. They defeated the Death Dollz (represented by Rosemary and Taya Valkyrie) on February 26, 2023 in Sunrise Manor, Nevada during the Impact tapings to win the titles (aired March 16).

See also
 Women's World Tag Team Championship

Notes

References

External links
 Impact Wrestling Knockouts World Tag Team Championship at Cagematch.net

2009 in professional wrestling
Impact Knockouts
Impact Wrestling championships
Women's professional wrestling tag team championships